Hey What (stylized in all uppercase) is the 13th full-length album by Minnesota-based duo Low, released on September 10, 2021, through Sub Pop. It is their third recording in a row produced by BJ Burton, building on the distorted sound of the band's previous album Double Negative (2018). Burton and Hey What were nominated in the Best Engineered Album, Non-Classical category at the 64th Annual Grammy Awards. It was their first album as a duo of Alan Sparhawk and Mimi Parker, all earlier Low albums being recorded as a trio, and the final album to feature Parker, who died on November 5, 2022.

Critical reception

Hey What was met with widespread critical acclaim upon its release. At Metacritic, which assigns a normalized rating out of 100 to reviews from professional publications, the album received an average score of 84, based on 22 reviews, indicating "universal acclaim".

Accolades

Track listing

Personnel
Low
 Mimi Parker – vocals, percussion
 Alan Sparhawk – guitar, vocals

Technical
 BJ Burton – production, recording, mixing
 Huntley Miller – mastering

Charts

References

2021 albums
Low (band) albums
Sub Pop albums
Albums produced by BJ Burton